A deed is a kind of document in real estate. Deed may also refer to:

The Deed, a reality television series
SS Deed, a British cargo ship
Jack Deed, an English cricketer
André Deed (1879–1940), a French actor and director